Garrett Riley (born April 27, 1995) is a Canadian ice sledge hockey player. He competed at the 2022 Winter Paralympics in Para ice hockey, winning a silver medal.

References

External links
 
 

Living people
1995 births
Paralympic sledge hockey players of Canada
Paralympic silver medalists for Canada